Sir Edward Cromwell Disbrowe GCG (1790–1851) was a British politician and diplomat.

Life and career

Disbrowe was born at Walton Hall, Walton-on-Trent, South Derbyshire, the son of Colonel Edward Disbrowe, and his wife Lady Charlotte Hobart, fourth daughter of George Hobart, 3rd Earl of Buckinghamshire. He was a lineal descendant of John Desborough (or Disbrowe), a senior commander in the Parliamentary Army who was brother-in-law to Oliver Cromwell. His father was Vice-Chamberlain to Queen Charlotte, wife of King George III.

Disbrowe was Member of Parliament (MP) for Windsor (1823–26), and later served in the British diplomatic corps in positions in Switzerland, Russia, Sweden and other postings. He was British Ambassador to the Netherlands from 1836 to 1851, where he died at the Hague. His body was returned to England on the ship HMS Lightning. He also served as a Deputy Lieutenant of the county of Derbyshire.

Family
Disbrowe was married to Anne Kennedy, daughter of the Hon. Robert Kennedy, son of Archibald Kennedy, 11th Earl of Cassilis.

Disbrowe's eldest daughter Charlotte, who lived at the family home in Derbyshire, became a writer of note, publishing two volumes recounting her father's diplomatic service, with particular attention to his time in Russia. Disbrowe's younger daughter Jane Harriet married Henry Christopher Wise of Woodcote House, Leek Wootton, Warwickshire, Member of Parliament. Wise was the great-great-grandson of Henry Wise, gardener to Queen Anne, who laid out Kensington Gardens.

References

External links

Lords of the Manor, Chelveston, Northamptonshire
Disbrowe, The Representative History of Great Britain and Ireland, Robert H. O'Byrne, London, 1848
History, Topography and Directory of Derbyshire, T. Bulmer, 1895

1790 births
1851 deaths
UK MPs 1820–1826
Members of the Parliament of the United Kingdom for English constituencies
People from South Derbyshire District
Ambassadors of the United Kingdom to Sweden
Ambassadors of the United Kingdom to Russia
Ambassadors of the United Kingdom to the Netherlands
Deputy Lieutenants of Derbyshire